Christmas with Yolanda Adams is the seventh studio album by American singer Yolanda Adams. Her first Christmas album, it was released by Elektra Records on October 13, 2000, in the United States.

Track listing

Charts

References

External links
 

Yolanda Adams albums
Elektra Records albums
2001 Christmas albums
Christmas albums by American artists
Gospel Christmas albums